Penicillium koreense is a fungus species in the family Trichocomaceae. Described as new to science in 2014, it is found in Korean soils. It is classified in the section Lanata-Divaricata of the subgenus Aspergilloides, which consists largely of soil-inhabiting species. The type strain (KACC 47721) was isolated from a bamboo field in Goryeong County.

References

koreense
Fungi described in 2014
Fungi of Asia